Goytre is a village in the community of Goetre Fawr in Monmouthshire, south east Wales, United Kingdom.

The population of the whole of Goetre Fawr, including Goytre, taken at the 2011 census was 2,393.

Location 
Goytre is located five miles south of Abergavenny and four miles north of Pontypool, Torfaen.

Etymology 

The word Goytre derives from the Welsh word for settlement/town in the woods.

History and amenities 

Goytre has a canal wharf  and visitor centre  on the Monmouthshire and Brecon Canal , complete with interactive sculptures . The Llanover private estate, once presided over by Lady Llanover owns the surrounding land.

References

External links

 www.geograph.co.uk : photos of Goetre and surrounding area
 Genuki info on Goetre
 images & interactive map of mile markers seen along the Monmouth & Brecon canal

Villages in Monmouthshire